Charaxes octavus is a butterfly in the family Nymphalidae. It is found in the Central African Republic. The habitat consists of tropical forests.

Taxonomy
Known from a single specimen from the type locality only. Probably a hybrid of brutus and lucretius. 

Charaxes lucretius group.

The members are:

Charaxes lucretius
Charaxes octavus
Charaxes odysseus
Charaxes lactetinctus

References

External links
Charaxes octavus images at Consortium for the Barcode of Life

Butterflies described in 1972
octavus
Endemic fauna of the Central African Republic
Butterflies of Africa